Coahuila, formally Coahuila de Zaragoza, officially the Free and Sovereign State of Coahuila de Zaragoza, is one of the 32 states of Mexico.

Coahuila borders the Mexican states of Nuevo León to the east, Zacatecas to the south, and Durango and Chihuahua to the west. To the north, Coahuila accounts for a  stretch of the Mexico–United States border, adjacent to the U.S. state of Texas along the course of the Rio Grande (Río Bravo del Norte). It comprises 38 municipalities (municipios). In 2020, Coahuila's population is 3,146,771 inhabitants.

The largest city and State Capital is the city of Saltillo; the second largest is Torreón (largest metropolitan area in Coahuila and 9th largest in Mexico); the third largest is Monclova (a former state capital); the fourth largest is Ciudad Acuña; and the fifth largest is Piedras Negras.

History
The name Coahuila derives from native terms for the region, and has been known by variations such as Cuagüila and Cuauila. Some historians believe that this means “flying serpent”, “place of many trees”, or “place where serpents creep”. The official name of the state is Coahuila de Zaragoza, in honor of General Ignacio Zaragoza.

The Spanish explored the north of Mexico some decades after their victory in Tenochtitlan, the capital of the Aztecs. Such exploration was delayed because the northern climate was harsher and there was no gold. The first Spanish settlement in the region now called Coahuila was at Minas de la Trinidad in 1577. Saltillo was settled in 1586, to form part of the province of Nueva Vizcaya of the Vice-royalty of New Spain. Later it became one of the first provinces of Nueva Extremadura to be explored by Europeans.  Among the 16th century settlers of Saltillo and other communities in Nueva Vizcaya were Tlaxcalans, who founded an independent community bordering Saltillo, called San Esteban de Nueva Tlaxcala. 
 
Coahuila y Tejas was one of the constituent states of the newly independent United Mexican States under their 1824 Constitution, and included Texas, Coahuila and Nuevo León. Later in the same year Nuevo León was detached, but Texas remained a part of the state until 1836, when it seceded to form the Republic of Texas. Monclova was the capital of the state from 1833 to 1835.

In 1840 Coahuila briefly became a member of the short lived Republic of the Rio Grande. In the mid-19th century, the Sánchez Navarro family owned a ranch of  mostly in Coahuila. It was the largest privately-owned property in the Americas.

On February 19, 1856, Santiago Vidaurri annexed Coahuila to his state, Nuevo León, but it regained its separate status in 1868.

During the Mexican Revolution, Francisco Villa attacked the city of Torreón.

On April 4, 2004, the border city of Piedras Negras was flooded. More than 30 people died and more than 4,000 lost their homes.  In 2007 Coahuila became the first state in Mexico to offer civil unions (Pacto Civil de Solidaridad) to same-sex couples.

Geography

The Sierra Madre Oriental runs northwest to southeast through the State, and the higher elevations are home to the Sierra Madre Oriental pine-oak forests. The northernmost fingers of the Sierra Madre Oriental, the Sierra del Burro and the Sierra del Carmen, reach to the border with the United States at the Rio Grande.

East of the range, the land slopes gently toward the Rio Grande, and is drained by several rivers, including the Salado and its tributary, the Sabinas River. The Tamaulipan mezquital, a dry shrubland ecoregion, occupies the eastern portion of the State, and extends across the Rio Grande into southern Texas.

The portion of the State west of the Sierra Madre Oriental lies on the Mexican Plateau, and is part of the Chihuahuan Desert. The Bolsón de Mapimí is a large endorheic basin which covers much of the western portion of the State and extends into adjacent portions of Chihuahua, Durango, and Zacatecas. The Nazas River, which flows east from Durango, and the Aguanaval River, which flows north from Zacatecas, empty into lakes in the Bolsón. Torreón, the most populous city in the State, lies on the Nazas in the irrigated Laguna Region, the (Comarca Lagunera), which straddles the border of Coahuila and Durango.

Coahuila contains two biosphere reserves. Maderas del Carmen lies on the northern border of the State, and includes sections of the Chihuahuan desert and sky islands of pine-oak forest in the Sierra del Carmen. The springs, lakes, and wetlands of the Cuatro Ciénegas Basin lie west of Monclova on the west slope of the Sierra Madre.

Coahuila is largely arid or semi-arid, but the rivers of the State support extensive irrigated agriculture, particularly cotton. The Parras district in the southern part of the State produces wines and brandies. The pine-oak forests of the Sierra Madre produce timber.

Flora and fauna

Demographics

The last population census run across Mexico in the year 2020, reports Coahuila de Zaragoza as having 3,146,771 inhabitants, which, considering its size, means that the state has a very low density, in fact as low as only 15 persons per square kilometer.

Coahuila's population is mainly made up of Criollos along with Mestizos. Fewer than 7,500 natives reside in Coahuila, or merely 0.3% of the total population. The rest of the population is composed of Americans, Canadian, and Japanese communities. According to the 2020 Census, 1.46% of Coahuila's population identified as Black, Afro-Mexican, or of African descent.

The rest of the demographic particulars in the state are very similar to national averages, such as a high life expectancy (reaching 75 years of age) and a Catholic majority.

Education

 Basic education 
Basic public education in Coahuila is mainly managed by the state's Secretary of Education, but federal-sustained schools are also very common. There are also a lot of private schools in the main cities of the state.

 Higher education 
Some of the most recognized universities in Coahuila include:

 Iberoamerican University of Torreón|Iberoamerican University (Universidad Iberoamericana) 
A private university part of the Jesuit University System with a campus in Torreón and a university extension center in Saltillo.

 Technological Institute of La Laguna (Instituto Tecnológico de la Laguna) 
The most recognized public technological university of La Laguna Region located in the city of Torreón.

 Technological Institute of Saltillo (Instituto Tecnológico de Saltillo)
 Monterrey Institute Of Technology and Higher Studies
It is the most known technological university in Mexico with two campuses: one in Saltillo and another one in Torreón.

 Autonomous University of La Laguna
 Antonio Narro Agrarian Autonomous University (UAAAN)
 Autonomous University of Coahuila (Universidad Autónoma de Coahuila)
It is considered the best public university of the states and it has campuses and schools all across Coahuila.

Economy 
About 95% of Mexico's coal reserves are found in Coahuila, which is the country's top mining state.

Saltillo and the Southeast region have one of the largest automobile industry in the country and the major industry in the state, hosting companies such as General Motors and Chrysler assembly plants.

Torreón has Met-Mex Peñoles, a mining company. The city is the world's largest silver producer and Mexico's largest gold producer. It also has Lala, a dairy products company, which produces 40% of Mexico's milk consumption and distribution.
 
As of 2005, Coahuila's economy represents 3.5% of Mexico's total gross domestic product or US$22,874 million. Coahuila's economy has a strong focus on export oriented manufacturing (i.e. maquiladora / INMEX). As of 2005, 221,273 people are employed in the manufacturing sector.  Foreign direct investment in Coahuila was US$143.1 million for 2005. The average wage for an employee in Coahuila is approximately 190 pesos per day.

On the other hand, Coahuila is the Mexican state with the highest level of public debt in the nation.

Municipalities

Coahuila is subdivided into five regions and 38 municipalities (municipios).

Major communities

Ciudad Acuña

Ciudad Frontera
Guerrero
Ciudad Melchor Múzquiz
Francisco I. Madero
Matamoros
Monclova

Nueva Rosita
Parras de la Fuente
Piedras Negras

Ramos Arizpe
Sabinas
Saltillo
San Pedro
Torreón

Media
Newspapers of Coahuila include: El Diario de Coahuila, El Guardián, El Heraldo de Saltillo, El Siglo de Torreón, Esto del Norte, La I (Laguna), la I (Saltillo), La Opinión Milenio, La Voz de Coahuila (Monclova), Noticias de El Sol de la Laguna, Vanguardia, Zócalo (Monclova), Zócalo (Piedras Negras), Zócalo El Periódico de Saltillo, and Zócalo Saltillo.

List of governors

This list is incomplete
José María Garza Galán (1886–1893)
José María Múzquiz (1894)
Miguel Cárdenas (1894–1909)
Jesús de Valle (1909–1911)
Venustiano Carranza (1911–1913)
Gustavo Espinoza Mireles (1917–1920)
Luis Gutiérrez Ortíz (1920–1921)
Arnulfo González (1921–1923)
Carlos Garza Castro (1923–1925)
Manuel Pérez Treviño (1925–1929)
Bruno Neira González (1929-1929)
Nazario S. Ortiz Garza (1929–1933)
Jesús Valdez Sánchez (1933–1937)
Pedro Rodríguez Triana (1937–1941)
Gabriel Cervera Riza (1941-1941)
Benecio López Padilla (1941–1945)
Ignacio Cepeda Dávila (1945–1947)
Ricardo Ainslie Rivera (1947–1948)
Paz Faz Risa (1948-1948)
Raúl López Sánchez (1948–1951)
Roman Cepeda Flores (1951–1957)
Raúl Madero González (1957–1963)
Braulio Fernández Aguirre (1963–1969)
Eulalio Gutiérrez Treviño (1969–1975)
Oscar Flores Tapia (1975–1981)
Francisco José Madero González (1981-1981)
José de las Fuentes Rodríguez (1981–1987)
Eliseo Mendoza Berrueto (1987–1993)
Rogelio Montemayor Seguy (1993–1999)
Enrique Martínez y Martínez (1999–2005)
Humberto Moreira Valdés (2005–2011) (Left)
Jorge Torres López (2011) (Humberto Moreira's substitute)
Rubén Moreira Valdez (2011–2017)
Miguel Riquelme Solís (2017-present)

People
Raul Allegre - Former football placekicker in the National Football League
Gladys Pearl Baker - mother of Marilyn Monroe and Berniece Baker Miracle
Reading Wood Black - Founder of Uvalde, Texas, spent American Civil War years in Coahuila
Venustiano Carranza - President of Mexico
Sangre Chicana - Professional wrestler
Mario Domm - musician and lead singer of Mexican pop band Camila
Luis Farell - Combat pilot and general
Eulalio Gutiérrez - President of Mexico
Rosario Ibarra - Activist, deputy and senator
Francisco I. Madero - President of Mexico November 1911 – February 1913
Pablo Montero - Singer and actor
Sanchez Navarro, large landholding family in the 18th and 19th centuries.
Oribe Peralta - football player
Horacio Piña - MLB pitcher
Marco Antonio Rubio - Professional boxer
Joakim Soria - MLB closer
Ari Telch - Actor
Andrea Villarreal - Feminist and revolutionary
Dr. Wagner - Professional wrestler
Dr. Wagner, Jr. - Professional wrestler
Susana Zabaleta - singer and actress
Humberto Zurita - Actor, director and producer

See also

 Coahuila y Texas
 Nueva Extremadura
 Nueva Vizcaya
 State Anthem of Coahuila
 States of Mexico

References

External links

 
  Coahuila State Government
  Coahuila State Government
 
 

 
1824 establishments in Mexico
Mexican Plateau states
States and territories established in 1824
States of Mexico